Gabriel Ernesto Pereyra Vázquez (born February 28, 1978) is an Argentine professional football coach and former player.

Pereyra played with River Plate until getting transferred to Cruz Azul in 2005. In the Apertura 2007 season, Pereyra was transferred to Atlante where he won the Mexican League title. Pereyra was loaned to Monarcas Morelia for six months on December 28, 2009. His loan was not renewed at the end of the season.

On July 3, 2020 Pereyra was named the new coach of Cimarrones de Sonora.

Honors

Club
 River Plate
 Apertura 1999, Clausura 2000, Clausura 2004
Atlante
 Apertura 2007

References

External links
 
 

1978 births
Living people
People from San Martín Department, Santa Fe
Argentine footballers
Association football midfielders
Atlante F.C. footballers
Cruz Azul footballers
Club Atlético River Plate footballers
Club Puebla players
Defensores de Belgrano footballers
Argentine Primera División players
Liga MX players
Argentine expatriate footballers
Expatriate footballers in Mexico
Sportspeople from Santa Fe Province